Felten is the surname of:
Edward Felten, a professor of computer science and public affairs at Princeton University
Yury Felten, a court architect to Catherine the Great, Empress of Russia

See also
Felton (disambiguation)
Fulton (disambiguation)